Desertibacillus  is a Gram-positive, non-endospore-forming and rod-shaped genus of bacteria from the family of Bacillaceae with one known species (Desertibacillus haloalkaliphilus). Desertibacillus haloalkaliphilus has been isolated from a saline desert from Little Rann of Kutch.

References

Bacillaceae
Bacteria genera
Monotypic bacteria genera
Bacteria described in 2017